Scandal is a 1989 British historical drama film, directed by Michael Caton-Jones. It is a fictionalised account of the Profumo affair that rocked the government of British prime minister Harold Macmillan. It stars Joanne Whalley as Christine Keeler and John Hurt as Stephen Ward, personalities at the heart of the affair.

Scandal was screened in competition at the 1989 Cannes Film Festival. Its theme song "Nothing Has Been Proved" was written and produced by Pet Shop Boys and sung by Dusty Springfield.

Plot
An English bon-vivant osteopath is enchanted with a young exotic dancer and invites her to live with him. He serves as friend and mentor, and through his wide range of contacts and his parties she and her friend meet and date members of the Conservative Party. A scandal develops when her affair with the Minister of War comes to public attention.

Cast

 John Hurt as Stephen Ward
 Joanne Whalley as Christine Keeler
 Bridget Fonda as Mandy Rice-Davies
 Ian McKellen as John Profumo
 Leslie Phillips as Lord Astor
 Britt Ekland as Mariella Novotny
 Daniel Massey as Mervyn Griffith-Jones
 Roland Gift as Johnny Edgecombe
 Jeroen Krabbé as Eugene Ivanov
 Jean Alexander as Mrs. Keeler
 Deborah Grant as Valerie Hobson
 Alex Norton as Detective Inspector
 Ronald Fraser as Justice Marshall
 Paul Brooke as John, Detective Sgt.
 Keith Allen as Kevin, Reporter Sunday Pictorial
 Ralph Brown as Paul Mann
 Iain Cuthbertson as Lord Hailsham
 Johnny Shannon as Peter Rachman
 Leon Herbert as Lucky Gordon

Production

Development
Australian screenwriter Michael Thomas and prospective producer Joe Boyd approached the BBC with the idea of a three-part mini-series on the Profumo affair. The BBC agreed to finance scripts for two of the 90-minute episodes, but support dried up when internal memos were found that forbade their production. Channel 4 turned them down on grounds of taste.

Boyd and Thomas joined forces with Palace Pictures who invested nearly £200,000 by 1985; a further £184,319 of development funding was raised from Robert Maxwell. As the prospects for a television mini-series began to fade, Palace Pictures became increasingly interested in making a feature film and estimated the budget requirements at £3.2 million. Co-founders Stephen Woolley and Nik Powell signed up first time director Michael Caton-Jones on a pay-or-play contract and began a marketing campaign to raise the finance. The controversial nature of the story, as well as its sexual content, appealed to Bob and Harvey Weinstein's independent film company, Miramax. The Weinsteins agreed to pay $2.35 million for the North American distribution rights.

The original screenplay was written as a historically detailed mini-series running four to five hours. When it was pared down to film length, it became more of a docudrama, with a chronology that is sometimes unclear. Producer Woolley arranged discreet meetings between Mandy Rice-Davies and Bridget Fonda to help the American actress with her portrayal.

Filming
Filming began in June 1988. Part of Scandal was filmed at Bathurst Mews in Bayswater, London, although Ward's house was actually at Wimpole Mews in Marylebone.  The exterior of 29 Francis Street, Victoria, SW1 was used as the Police Station.

Poster

Christine Keeler took part in a publicity shoot with photographer Lewis Morley for a 1963 film about the Profumo Affair, The Keeler Affair. Under pressure to pose nude, Keeler agreed to sit straddling the chair with just the back of the chair as a screen. The film was never released in the United Kingdom, but the image became "one of the most famous and most imitated photographs ever published". Joanne Whalley-Kilmer recreated the pose for the theatrical release poster.

US classification
The Weinsteins had been impressed by the amount of free publicity generated for Alan Parker's Angel Heart in 1987 when it was initially given an "X" rating in the United States. Beginning with Scandal, Harvey Weinstein would routinely help publicise Miramax's films by attacking the integrity of the Classification and Rating Administration (CARA) and X ratings. They encouraged Woolley and Powell to deliver an X rated movie, and in particular to include nude shots of Whalley-Kilmer. The film was awarded an X rating for its orgy scene, but after two appeals and three seconds of edits, it was released with an "R" rating.

Soundtrack
The soundtrack, and soundtrack album, included a specially written song by the Pet Shop Boys "Nothing Has Been Proved" for Dusty Springfield.

Reception
The film received positive reviews. At the movie review aggregator Rotten Tomatoes, Scandal received an overall approval rating of 91% based on 32 reviews. Roger Ebert awarded it four stars out of four and said the film was "surprisingly wise about the complexities of the human heart". He praised the performance of John Hurt. Following Hurt's death, The Guardian film critic Peter Bradshaw said the performance was Hurt's masterpiece.

The film made a comfortable profit. In the UK it made £3,705,065.

Commenting on the pain felt by his parents when the film was released, David Profumo said, "I never felt sorrier for them in my life".

References

Notes

Citations

External links
 
 

1989 films
1980s political drama films
1980s historical drama films
British historical drama films
British political drama films
1980s English-language films
Films about adultery in the United Kingdom
British films based on actual events
Films directed by Michael Caton-Jones
Films scored by Carl Davis
Films set in 1963
Films set in London
Palace Pictures films
Cultural depictions of John Profumo
Cultural depictions of Christine Keeler
1989 directorial debut films
1980s British films